Atmosphere is a luxury residential superstructure in Kolkata, India. Atmosphere consists of two tall towers and a 'Deya', the world's first residential floating sky sculpture.

"Deya"

Sitting 500 ft in the air, 'Deya' (which means cloud in Bengali) connects the two towers that make up Atmosphere. Deya houses club facilities for the residents of Atmosphere. Initially conceived as a cloud changing in porosity and form, Deya is not a physical extension of the tower as such, since the majority of the spaces within are open air. The skin is composed of expanded mesh panels wrapped around structural ribs. Special panels carrying shimmering mobile reflective disks are scattered across this mesh. The porosity of these materials enables Deya to appear different in form depending on how it is lit. The Deya will house the residents' community and recreational facilities, including a swimming pool, gymnasium, spas, running track, sporting facilities, virtual golf, cinema, meeting spaces and function facilities.

Other 
Atmosphere was selected by Nat Geo to feature in their Megastructures documentary series.

See also
List of tallest buildings in Kolkata

References

External links 
 The Atmosphere official site

Skyscrapers in India
Foster and Partners buildings
Residential skyscrapers in India